Augusto Silva (22 March 1902 – 8 January 1962) was a Portuguese football midfielder and manager.

Club career
Born in Lisbon, Silva spent his entire career with local C.F. Os Belenenses, playing with them as the Primeira Liga was named Championship of Portugal. He retired in 1934, at the age of 32.

Silva then became a manager, having several spells with his only club. In the 1945–46 season, he was in charge as it won the first and only national championship in its history.

International career
Silva won 21 caps for Portugal, which was a national record for 16 years. He was part of the squad at the 1928 Summer Olympics, scoring once for the eventual quarter-finalists.

See also
List of one-club men

References

External links

1902 births
1962 deaths
Footballers from Lisbon
Portuguese footballers
Association football midfielders
Primeira Liga players
C.F. Os Belenenses players
Portugal international footballers
Olympic footballers of Portugal
Footballers at the 1928 Summer Olympics
Primeira Liga managers
C.F. Os Belenenses managers
G.D. Estoril Praia managers
FC Porto managers
Portuguese football managers